In geometry, the exsphere of a face of a regular polyhedron is the sphere outside the polyhedron which touches the face and the planes defined by extending the adjacent faces outwards. It is tangent to the face externally and tangent to the adjacent faces internally.

It is the 3-dimensional equivalent of the excircle.

The sphere is more generally well-defined for any face which is a regular
polygon and delimited by faces with the same dihedral angles
at the shared edges. Faces of semi-regular polyhedra often 
have different types of faces, which define exspheres of different size with each type of face.

Parameters 
The exsphere touches the face of the regular polyedron at the center
of the incircle of that face. If the exsphere radius is denoted , the radius of this incircle 
and the dihedral angle between the face and the extension of the 
adjacent face , the center of the exsphere
is located from the viewpoint at the middle of one edge of the
face by bisecting the dihedral angle. Therefore

 is the 180-degree complement of the 
internal face-to-face angle.

Tetrahedron 
Applied to the geometry of the Tetrahedron of edge length ,
we have an incircle radius  (derived by dividing twice the face area  through the
perimeter ), a dihedral angle , and in consequence .

Cube 
The radius of the exspheres of the 6 faces of the Cube
is the same as the radius of the inscribed
sphere, since  and its complement are the same, 90 degrees.

Icosahedron 
The dihedral angle applicable to the Icosahedron is derived by
considering the coordinates of two triangles with a common edge,
for example one face with vertices
at

the other at

where  is the golden ratio. Subtracting vertex coordinates
defines edge vectors,

of the first face and

of the other. Cross products of the edges of the first face and second
face yield (not normalized) face normal vectors

of the first and

of the second face, using .
The dot product between these two face normals yields the cosine
of the dihedral angle,

 

 

See also 
 Insphere

External links 

Geometry